The George and Vulture is a restaurant in London. There has been an inn on the site, which is off Lombard Street in the historic City of London district, since 1142. It was said to be a meeting place of the notorious Hell-Fire Club and is now a revered City chop house.

It is mentioned at least 20 times in the 1837 novel The Pickwick Papers by Charles Dickens, who frequently drank there himself. The George and Vulture has been the headquarters of the City Pickwick Club since its foundation. When it was threatened with demolition, Cedric Charles Dickens, the author's great-grandson, campaigned to save it. Since 1950 it has been the home of his Dickens Pickwick Club and, in the same year, it became the venue for the Christmas Day Dickens family gathering, in the Dickens Room.

The George and Vulture is a Grade II listed building, dating back to the early 18th century. It is now run by Samuel Smiths Old Brewery (Tadcaster).

References

External links
 
Charles Dickens London – The George And Vulture

Commercial buildings completed in 1748
Grade II listed pubs in the City of London
Charles Dickens
The Pickwick Papers
Hellfire Club